Mabel Collins (9 September 1851 – 31 March 1927) was a British theosophist and author of over 46 books.

Life
Collins was born in St Peter Port, Guernsey. She was a writer of popular occult novels, a fashion writer and an anti-vivisection campaigner.

In 1909 she wrote a political play called Outlawed with Alice Chapin. Chapin was an American born actress who was an active suffragette. By the time it was produced at the Court Theatre in November 1911 Chapin was a convicted criminal for her militancy.

Gossip

Aleister Crowley claimed that Vittoria Cremers had suggested that Collins was at one time being romantically pursued by both Cremers and alleged occultist Robert Donston Stephenson. Cremers supposedly claimed that during this time she found five blood-soaked ties in a trunk under Stephenson's bed, corresponding to the five murders committed in Whitechapel by Jack the Ripper.

Works 
Light on the Path (1885)
The Prettiest Woman in Warsaw (1885)
Through the Gates of Gold (1887)
The Blossom and the Fruit (1887)
The Idyll of the White Lotus (1890)
Morial the Mahatma (1892)
Suggestion (1892)
Juliet’s Lovers (1893)
The Story of the Year (1895)
The Star Sapphire (1896)
A Cry From Afar (1905)
Loves Chaplet (1905)
Fragments of Thought and Life (1908)
Outlawed (1909) with Alice Chapin - a play staged in 1911
When the Sun Moves Northward (1912)
The Transparent Jewel (1913)
The Story of Sensa (1913) (A mystery play in three acts adapted from The Idyll of the White Lotus).
As the Flower Grows (1915)

See also 
 Mabel Collins as fiction writer

References

External links 
Mabel Collins biography
Mabel Collins' theosophical works
Mabel Collins on the Mystical Site www.mysticism.nl
 
 
 

1851 births
1927 deaths
British Theosophists
Guernsey women
Women mystics